Song Yu-bin (Hangul: 송유빈, born April 28, 1998), commonly referred to as Song Yuvin, is a South Korean singer and actor. He is best known as a contestant of Superstar K6 and Produce X 101, and for being one of the main vocalists of the South Korean group Myteen. Following Myteen's disbandment in 2019, he debuted as a member of the duo B.O.Y, until their disbandment in April 2021.

Song made his solo debut on May 30, 2016, with his digital single "It's You To The Bone". He made his acting debut in the 2016 drama Age of Youth.

Career

1998–2014: Early life
Song Yuvin was born on April 28, 1998, in Daegu, South Korea. His family consists of his parents and an older sister. He graduated from the Broadcasting and Entertainment department of Hanlim Multi Art High School in 2017, alongside Dahyun from Twice and the actor Shin Dong-woo. Song is currently attending the Practical Music department of Dong-ah Institute of Media and Arts.

His parents and sister all like singing, which made Yuvin interested as well. When he was in elementary school, he would go to karaoke rooms a lot and started singing  ballads when he entered middle school. His parents gave him the permission to attend a vocal academy, after his friends praised him for his vocals, despite originally not wanting him to become a singer. He attended the academy for three months as a hobby, before being asked various times to audition for Superstar K6.

2014–2016: Superstar K6 and career beginnings
Song appeared on the first episode of Superstar K6, singing "Farewell Taxi" by Kim Yeon-woo. He received praises from the judges for his visuals and vocals. He quickly became a popular contestant, reaching the top 4, before being eliminated during the 12th episode of the show. Song had meetings with different music companies after Superstar K6 was over, including The Music Works, whose manager came directly to him. He signed with them in February 2015.

Song was featured on Baek Ji-young's single "Garosugil at Dawn" in March 2015. The song quickly became a hit, reaching the top ranks on various music charts. In May of the same year, he released his first OST with Kim Na-young for the drama The Girl Who Sees Smells. In April 2016, Song released an OST for the drama Goodbye Mr. Black and made his solo debut a month later with "It's You To The Bone". It was announced the same month that Song would make his idol debut as a member of the boy group Myteen in 2017.

Alongside Sam Kim and Eric Nam, Song took part in the eighth season of The Friends where they travelled to Costa Rica. The show aired during summer 2016 for 4 episodes. In July 2016, he made his acting debut with a cameo appearance in the third episode of the drama Age of Youth. He spent the rest of the year releasing other OST and collaborations, while attending Myteen's "Follow Myteen Tour" performances in different South Korean cities and in Hong Kong.

2017–present: Myteen, B.O.Y, and solo career

In January 2017, Song appeared on Myteen's pre-debut reality show Myteen Go. The show aired for 7 episodes until late February. He released an OST for the drama Good Manager on February 18. Myteen made their debut on July 26 with their first EP "Myteen Go!". Song walked as model during the Seoul Fashion Week in October 2017. He was originally supposed to take part in the survival program Mix Nine but became a MC on the show Kiss The Beauty instead and couldn't participate in the former. In January 2018, Song attended the 14th Idol Star Athletics Championships that aired a month after. In February, Song and some of his labelmates appeared as panelists on I Can See Your Voice. He appeared on an episode of the show Mama Papa with his teammate Eunsu in April.

Myteen made their first comeback in July 2018 with their EP "F;uzzle". On July 12, Song released an OST for the drama What's Wrong with Secretary Kim. In August, he took part in the 15th Idol Star Athletics Championships with his teammate Shin Jun-seob, the show was aired in September. In October, Song became a contestant on the show King of Mask Singer, appearing on the 173rd episode. He lost during the first round against Seola of Cosmic Girls.

In February 2019, he became the male lead character in the 2-episode drama Loss Time Life along with Kwon Mina. Song also sang the OST for the drama. From March 2019 to July 2019, Song, alongside his teammate Kim Kook-heon, participated in the survival show Produce X 101. He advanced to the final round of the show where he ultimately ranked 16th.  Song and Kim Kook-heon would later debut in the group B.O.Y in January 2020.

On April 30, 2021, The Music Works announced that Yuvin's contract expired and that he left the company.

On April 26, 2022, it was announced that Yuvin has signed an exclusive contract with Flex M, a subsidiary of Kakao Entertainment.

Discography

Singles

As lead artist

As featured artist

Soundtrack appearances

Compilation appearances

Songwriting and composing credits

Music videos

Filmography

Television series

Television shows

Web shows

References

External links

 

1998 births
Living people
K-pop singers
South Korean male idols
South Korean rhythm and blues singers
Superstar K participants
Hanlim Multi Art School alumni
People from Daegu
Produce 101 contestants
21st-century South Korean male singers